Prime Circle are a South African rock band, based in Johannesburg. The band has released 7 studio albums and achieved either gold or platinum status in South Africa. The band has expanded its audience to England and Europe where they are represented by a German agent and have signed an international recording deal, performing at festivals and their own shows in Germany.

Early years 
Prime Circle was formed in the mining town of Witbank, Mpumalanga in December 2001. The band signed with independent local label, David Gresham Records in 2002, whose first two albums are considered to have defined the band's signature sound and style. Since 2008, Prime Circle has been signed to EMI Music South Africa.

Band members

Current band members 

 Ross Learmonth – vocals, rhythm guitar, acoustic guitar, songwriter
 Marco Gomes – bass, songwriter
 Dale Schnettler – drums, backing vocals, acoustic guitar, percussion, songwriter
 Dirk Bisschoff – lead guitar, acoustic guitar, songwriter
 Neil Breytenbach – keyboards, songwriter

Past band members 

 Gerhard Venter

Career landmarks

2016 

 The single, 'Ghosts', reached the Top 150 of Germany's weekly airplay charts. 
 Performed at Rock im Revier and Rockavaria in Germany.
 Performed alongside Iron Maiden and Iggy Pop at Rock in Vienna in Austria as part of their 30-day tour to promote their first official European release, Let the Night In (Deluxe Edition).
 Headlined at Kieler Woche, Hamburg Harley Days, (the biggest annual Harley Davidson gathering in Germany) and the UEFA Champions League Festival in Milan.
 Booked from July to September, to open as special guests for The BossHoss at a series of German festivals. 
 Invited to headline the Rock Auf Der Burg Königstein and the Pflasterfest in Hameln, Germany.

Awards and nominations 
Prime Circle have won several South African Music Awards for their albums and music videos, including Best Music Video of the Year at the SAMA XXI category as well as nominated for the MTV Africa Music Awards for Best Pop & Alternative Act and Best Music Video of the Year for their single DOORS off their album Let The Night In. The band was also nominated for Best Artist in African Rock at the All Africa Music Awards.

Acts performed with 

 Queen
 Annie Lennox
 Katie Melua
 Will Smith
 Seether
 Metallica
 Collective Soul 
 Rasmus
 Linkin Park
 Iron Maiden
 Incubus
 In Flames
 Robert Plant 
 The Prodigy
 Peter Gabriel
 GooGoo Dolls
 Live: November 2003: Opening act for the Birds of Pray tour to South Africa.
 Korn
 Limp Bizkit 
 W.A.S.P.
 Skillet
 Black Sabbath
 Soundgarden
 Avenged Sevenfold
 Volbeat
 Sabaton
 Muse
 Hugh Masakela
 Chris Cornell
 Good Charlotte
 Thirty Seconds To Mars 
 Kaiser Chiefs
 Simple Plan
 3 Doors Down 
 Dropkick Murphys 
 Slash 
 Guano Apes
 Soulfly
 August Burns Red
 Puddle Of Mudd
 Richard Marx
 Megadeth
 Rob Zombie 
 Alice in Chains 
 Anthrax
 Slayer
 Bring Me the Horizon 
 Steel Panther
 Black Label Society
 Sepultura
 Mastodon
 Trivium
 K's Choice
 Billy Talent
 Feeder
 Ugly Kid Joe
 Stone Sour
 Beth Hart
 Johnny Clegg
 The Bravery
 Jamiroquai
 Alter Bridge
 Garbage
 The BossHoss
 Iggy Pop
 Rammstein
 The Subways
 Royal Republic
 Nightwish
 In Extremo
 Kreator
 Gojira
 Powerwolf
 Zakk Wyle
 Shinedown
 Scott Strapp
 Biffy Clyro

Albums

Hello Crazy World (2002) 

Their July 2002 debut album, "Hello Crazy World" was a success in South Africa with the first single, "Hello" topping the national charts for 28 weeks.

This was followed in 2003 and 2004 by "Let Me Go", "As Long As I Am Here", "My Inspiration" and "Same Goes For You" all topping the charts in 2003 and 2004. The album achieved platinum sales status. The follow up album, "Live This Life" was already in the making and was released in 2005.

Live This Life (2005) 

Their second album "Live this Life" (October 2005 release) reached gold status early in 2006 and "Miracle", "Maybe Wrong" and "Way It Could Be" joined the title track of the album in chart success through to 2007 with a remake of "As Long As I Am Here" following on their heels. The two albums cemented their position as the biggest selling South African rock act of 2003/2004/2005/2006.

In 2007 the band performed internationally at the Dubai Desert Rock Festival with names like Prodigy, Iron Maiden and Robert Plant and later that year sharing the second 46664 stage with acts like Peter Gabriel, Live and GooGoo Dolls.

Living in a Crazy World (DVD) (2006) 
In July 2006, a DVD entitled Living in a Crazy World was released, which featured hits from their first two albums performed live at The Function Room in Johannesburg.

Best of (box set) (2007) 
In 2007 David Gresham Records released a CD / DVD Best of box set which followed the success of previous albums. The CD featured 17 tracks including some acoustic, live and remixed versions of previously released tracks and a new track, Moments which reached no.1 on many local radio charts.

All or Nothing (CD and DVD) (2008) 

Neil Breytenbach joined the band on the keyboards in July 2007 and pre-production of "All Or Nothing" commenced before the end of the year. Neil's arrival opened the band up to adding more keyboards to their songs, especially in live performances.

All or Nothing was released by the band's new record label, EMI Music South Africa in June 2008 followed in 2009 by a live DVD recorded during the launch of the album. The DVD release coincided with an international release of the All or Nothing CD.

In 2009 "All or Nothing" reached platinum status and charted with "Out Of This Place" and "All I Need", "Consider Me". The album was nominated for a SAMA in that year, and "Consider Me" brought another nomination for the band the following year.

2009 saw Prime Circle depart for a tour of Dubai, Bahrain and London and following on from the exposure gained from their performances around the 20/20 cricket series held in South Africa, embarked on a Hard Rock Cafe tour of India. Their first foray into Europe came that year with showcases in Berlin and Cologne.

In 2010 the band returned to India playing the Rock in India concert.

Jekyll and Hyde (2010) 

In early 2010 the band began work on their fourth studio album Jekyll & Hyde. Kevin Shirley mastered the tracks.

Jekyll & Hyde was released in South Africa in September 2010 in derivatives: A single CD, a double CD featuring the live audio recordings from the "All Or Nothing" DVD and a CD/DVD pack featuring a documentary shot during the band's second tour to India.

The album's first single Breathing, released in August went No. 1 on regional stations in the first week  and repeated the chart topping success on national radio. The track topped the radio airplay charts for that year (most played).

Evidence (2012) 

In July 2012 the band entered the studio to record their fifth studio album Evidence which was released on 12 November 2012.

The first released single from this album, "Time Kills Us All" played on radio for the first time on 28 September 2012 and just missed the top position on the KIA Take 40 SA 15 weeks later reaching position 2 but staying in the charts for 18 weeks.

In November 2012 the second single and title track of the album was released on national radio station, 5FM followed by a South African national "Evidence" tour.

On 7 February 2013 the band announced the dates for their return to Germany to launch the album in Europe. The band was barely back in South Africa before announcing that in June 2013 they would be opening for 3 Doors Down in Germany, Belgium, Netherlands and Switzerland during that band's Best of album tour.

Let The Night In (2014) 

The band released their sixth studio album entitled Let The Night In on 13 June 2014 under their own label. For the first time, the band visited countries like France and Spain in the initial leg of touring the album in June, and featured at Graspop in Belgium for the first time too. On their return to South Africa they embarked on their first ever arena tour of the country with 3 sold out dates at The Teatro, Montecasino, and their first appearance at the Grand Arena, Grand West. The first single from the album, "Gone" was released 21 May 2014. The song received critical acclaim with its rock/hip hop styling, receiving airplay on stations previously the preserve of more urban sounds and topping radio charts across South Africa. The second single, Doors, was released on 21 August 2014 immediately entering the charts on numerous radio stations. On 6 October 2014, the band returned to Europe for a month-long tour including Germany, Austria, Belgium, United Kingdom and for the first time, Italy.

Keep Marching On (2017) 
Prime Circle in association with RADA Unearthed, presented Keep Marching On.

If You Don't You Never Will (2017) 
The band released their seventh studio album entitled If You Don't You Never Will on 22 September under their own label Prime Records. The band took the album on the road, making their first stop in Australia before proceeding to Europe on the Head in The Clouds Tour. The tour continued in South Africa December 2017 into 2018 then continuing back to Europe February. They achieved number 1 with their first single "The Gift" in November 2017, then hit a second number 1 with their second single "Pretty Like The Sun".

Live World (2019) 
Live World is Prime Circle's eighth album release which captures 25 live recordings done in several countries around the world over several years.

Concert tours 

2007: Dubai Desert Rock Festival, Dubai.
          Headliners for Dubai Desert Rock Festival included the likes of Iron Maiden, Stone Sour, In Flames, Incubus, Prodigy, The Bravery and more.

2010: Rock 'n India, India.

2011: Reload Festival , Germany. 

          Headliners ranged from Dropkick Murphys, Slash feat. Myles Kennedy & The Conspirators, Guano Apes, Puddle of Mudd and more.

2012: Homelandz Festival , UK.

2014: Graspop Metal Meeting, Belgium. 

          Played on the main stage alongside headliners Black Sabbath, Carcass and Napalm Death.

2016: Stage was shared with the likes of Rammstein, Slayer, Anthrax, Babymetal, Iggy Pop, Biffy Clyro, Monster Truck, Nightwish, Shinedown, and Iron Maiden.
 2016 UEFA Champions League Final, Milan.
 Live from the official football festival of the UEFA Champions League.
 Rock im Revier Festival , Dortmund.
 Rockavaria Festival , Munich.
 Rock in Vienna , Austria.
2017: O2 Academy Islington, London.

2017: Snow Tunes Festival , Australia.

Awards and nominations

Band members 
Current Members
 Ross Learmoth – lead vocals, rhythm guitar, acoustic guitar, songwriter
 Marco Gomes – bass, songwriter
 Dale Schnettler – drums, backing vocals, acoustic guitar, percussion, songwriter
 Dirk Bisschoff – lead guitar, acoustic guitar, songwriter
 Neil Breytenbach – keyboards, songwriter

Discography

Studio albums 
 Hello Crazy World (2002)
 Live This Life (29 August 2005)
 All or Nothing (19 June 2008)
 Jekyll & Hyde (9 September 2010)
 Evidence (12 November 2012)
 Let the Night In (13 June 2014)
 Let the Night In (Deluxe Edition) (13 May 2016)
 If You Don't You Never Will (22 September 2017)

Compilations, special releases and DVD releases 
 Hello Crazy World (Special Edition) (2003)
 Hello Crazy World (Double Disk Edition) (2004)
 Living in a Crazy World (Live DVD) (26 June 2006)
 Living in a Crazy World (CD/DVD) (2007)
 The Best of Prime Circle (5 October 2007)
 All or Nothing (Live DVD) (20 March 2009)
 All or Nothing (International Release) (19 June 2009)
 The Ultimate Prime Circle (1 September 2010)
 Live World (29 November 2019)

See also 
 List of South African musicians

References

External links 
 
 Prime Circle on Facebook

South African rock music groups
South African musical groups